This is a list of Bien de Interés Cultural landmarks in the Province of Guadalajara, Spain.

Bridge of Henares
Castle of Atienza
Castle of Pelegrina
Chapel of Luis de Lucena
Church of El Salvador
Church of la Piedad (Guadalajara)
Church of los Remedios
Church of San Bartolomé*Sigüenza Cathedral
Church of San Ginés
Church of San Juan Bautista
Church of San Miguel
Church of San Nicolás
Church of Santiago el Mayor
Church of Santo Domingo de Silos (Millana)
Convent of las Carmelitas de San José
Co-cathedral of Santa María de la Fuente la Mayor
Cueva de los Casares
Foundation of San Diego de Alcalá-Fundación de la Vega del Pozo
Goyeneche Palace
Hermitage of Santa Coloma de Albendiego
Palace of Antonio de Mendoza
Palace of Infantado
Palace of the Dukes of Medinaceli (Cogolludo)
Salt mine of Imón
Santa Maria de Ovila
Tower of Álvar Fáñez

References 

Guadalajara